Barbara Boucher Owens is an American computer scientist noted for her leadership in computer science education. She was the Chair of SIGCSE from 2007 to 2010 and an elected member of the SIGCSE Board for 16 years from 1997 to 2013.

Education
Boucher Owens received a Bachelor of Arts degree in Psychology from Ohio Wesleyan University in 1965. She received a Master of Arts degree in Experimental Psychology from The University of Texas at Austin in 1967 and a Doctor of Philosophy in Computer Applications to Education from  New York University in 1977.

Career and research
Boucher Owens started her career at IBM in 1967 in the area of computer assisted instruction. She began her teaching career in 1970 at Brooklyn College as an Instructor in Psychology and founded their Department of Computer Science in 1971, teaching there until 1977. She was an Instructor of Computer Science at City University of New York (CUNY) in 1979. She has been a faculty member at Mercy College in Computer Science from 1982 to 1988. She became an associate professor at St. Edward's University in Computer Science in 1989 and was promoted to Professor of Computer Science in 1996. In 1999 she became an Associate Professor of Computer Science at Southwestern University, and retired as an Emeritus Professor in 2012.

Boucher Owens is one of the co-founders of the Computing Educators Oral History Project.

Awards and honors

Boucher Owens notable awards include the following awards.

 SIGCSE Award for Lifetime Service to the Computer Science Education Community (2016).
 ACM Distinguished Educator (2012).

References

American women computer scientists
American computer scientists
Living people
Ohio Wesleyan University alumni
University of Texas at Austin College of Liberal Arts alumni
Place of birth missing (living people)
Year of birth missing (living people)
New York University alumni
Mercy College (New York) faculty
Computer science educators
Brooklyn College faculty
American women academics
21st-century American women